The Taylorcraft Auster was a British military liaison and observation aircraft produced by the Taylorcraft Aeroplanes (England) Limited company during the Second World War.

Design and development
The Auster was a twice-removed development of an American Taylorcraft design of civilian aircraft, the Model A. The Model A had to be redesigned in Britain to meet more stringent Civil Aviation standards and was named the Taylorcraft Plus C. After the start of the Second World War, the company developed the model further as an Air Observation Post (AOP)—flown by officers of the Royal Artillery and used for directing artillery fire of British Army Royal Artillery units.

The Plus C was re-engined with the Blackburn Cirrus Minor I engine and redesignated the Taylorcraft Plus D. Most of the civil Plus Cs and Ds were impressed into Royal Air Force service, the Plus Cs were re-engined with the Cirrus Minor I and redesignated as Plus C2.

Prewar tests identified the Taylorcraft Model D as the most suitable aircraft for the AOP role.  Three more Ds were purchased from Taylorcraft and a trials unit, D Flight, under Major Charles Bazeley RA, formed at Old Sarum on 1 February 1940. The flight with three Austers and one Stinson Voyager, and three artillery and one RAF pilots, moved to France where they trained with artillery and practised fighter avoidance with Hurricanes of Air Component before moving south to train with French artillery. The flight did not participate in the fighting and withdrew without loss to the UK. However, the War Office then ordered 100 Stinson L-1 Vigilants. Formation of the RAF's Army Cooperation Command in December 1940 led to the RAF rejecting the very notion of light AOP aircraft.

Intercession by General Alan Brooke led to an accommodation that led to the first AOP pilot course for artillery officers taking place in October 1940 and in 1941, the first AOP squadron, No 651, formed. Stinson Vigilants eventually arrived in early 1942 but most had been severely damaged in transit leading to the adoption of the Taylorcraft Auster 1 and an order for 100 aircraft placed. Some of the Stinsons were resurrected but found to be too big for the AOP role.

The Auster II was a re-engined aircraft with an American 130 hp (97 kW) Lycoming O-290 engine. Due to the shortage of American engines that version was not built but led to the Auster III (Model E), which was the same as the Auster I but had a 130 hp (97 kW) de Havilland Gipsy Major engine. The next development was the Auster IV (Model G) which had a slightly larger cabin with three seats and used the Lycoming O-290. The major production version was the Auster V (Model J) which was an Auster IV with blind flying instruments, and a conventional trimmer design.

Post war, the Auster Mark V was used as the basis for the Auster J/1 Autocrat intended for the civilian market; the British firm having changed their name to Auster and stopped licensing from Taylorcraft. Further military aircraft were supplied post war; the Auster AOP6, Auster T7 (a trainer), and the Auster AOP9.

Operational history
The Auster Mark III, IV and V were issued to 12 RAF, one Polish and three Royal Canadian Air Force (RCAF) Air Observation Post (AOP) Squadrons. The first to deploy was No. 651 Squadron RAF. The leading elements landed in Algiers on 12 November 1942 with eight aircraft, 11 Royal Artillery (RA) pilots, 39 RA soldiers and 25 airmen (mostly maintenance technicians). The normal strength of an AOP squadron was 12 aircraft, 19 RA officers (all pilots), 83 RA other ranks and 63 RAF including two administrative officers. Aircraft were fitted with the Army's No 22 Wireless, an HF set providing two-way voice communications with artillery units and formations on the ground.

On 31 March 1943 the  Army Cooperation Command was disbanded, most of its assets being used to form the Second Tactical Air Force. Four squadrons (No. 651, No. 654 Squadron RAF, No. 655 Squadron RAF and No. 657 Squadron RAF) fought in North Africa and Italy, being joined from August 1944 by No. 663 Polish squadron. The other seven squadrons (Nos. 652, 653, 658, 659, 660, 661 and 662 of the RAF) operated after D-Day in France, the Low Countries and into Germany.

No. 664 Squadron RCAF, No. 665 Squadron RCAF, and No. 666 Squadron RCAF were also issued with the Auster Mk. IV and V, formed in the UK at RAF Andover in late 1944 and early 1945. The RCAF squadrons were manned by Canadian personnel of the Royal Canadian Artillery and the RCAF, with brief secondment to the squadrons with pilots from the Royal Artillery; control was maintained in the UK by 70 Group, RAF Fighter Command. The three squadrons deployed from RAF Andover, England, to the Netherlands, to Dunkirk in France, where the last Canadian 'shots' in Europe were fired, and later to occupied Germany. No. 656 Squadron RAF was assigned to 14th Army and used Austers in Burma, generally with flights assigned to each corps. In European theatres a squadron was generally assigned to each corps, but under command for technical matters of an RAF group.

The Royal Australian Air Force's No. 16 AOP Flight and No. 17 AOP Flight operated Auster Mark III aircraft in support of the Australian Army in the Pacific Theatre from October 1944 until the end of the war.

Postwar Auster AOP aircraft were reorganised into independent flights (probably because the RAF used Wing-Commanders, equivalent to Lieutenant-Colonels, to command squadrons while the army insisted on a major's command) including 1903 Flight in Korea that had artillery pilots from several Commonwealth countries. There was also an Auster-equipped Liaison Flight, No 1913, in that theatre. Air OP flights also operated in the Malayan Emergency. Several AOP squadrons were reformed within the Royal Auxiliary Air Force in 1949 and these operated some AOP.5s, AOP.6s and AOP.9s until at least March 1957, when the Auxiliary Air Force was disbanded. All Auster AOP units were transferred to the Army Air Corps when it was formed in September 1957, with AAC squadrons using numbers starting with 651. The air observation duties, counter-insurgency and casualty evacuation roles performed by Auster and similar light aircraft were generally taken over by light helicopters from the mid-1960s.

Several Taylorcraft Austers formed, with other civil light aircraft, part of the initial equipment of the Sherut Avir, formed in November 1947 as the air component of the Jewish paramilitary organisation Haganah, which later became part of the Israeli Air Force. They were supplemented early in 1948 by six ex-RAF Austers that had been assembled from hulks of 25 aircraft purchased as scrap. These aircraft formed the core of Israel's air force in the early part of the 1947–1949 Palestine war, being used for reconnaissance and resupply missions, while also being used to drop home-made bombs on Arab forces.

Variants

Taylorcraft Plus C
Original civilian version with a Lycoming O-145-A2 engine, 23 built (one prototype and 22 production aircraft).
Taylorcraft Plus C2
Plus C re-engined with a  Cirrus Minor I engine for the Royal Air Force, 20 conversions.
Taylorcraft Plus D
Plus C with a 90hp Cirrus Minor I engine, nine built.
Taylorcraft Auster I
(Model D1) Military version of Plus C, 100 built.
Taylorcraft Auster II
(Model F) Auster I with a Lycoming O-290 engine, two built, later converted to Auster IIIs
Taylorcraft Auster III
(Model E) Auster I with a de Havilland Gipsy Major engine, two prototypes converted from Model F (Auster I) and 467 built new.
Taylorcraft Auster IV
(Model G) Three-seat version with a Lycoming O-290-3/1 H.O. engine, 253 built.
Taylorcraft Auster V
(Model J) Auster IV with blind flying instruments (Vacuum pump) and flap modification, and removable armour plate installed for pilot only, 791 built.
Taylorcraft Auster Model H
Experimental tandem two-seat training glider converted from a Taylorcraft B.

Operators

Military operators

 Royal Australian Air Force 56 Auster IIIs
 No. 2 Communications Unit RAAF
 No. 16 Air Observation Post Flight RAAF
 No. 17 Air Observation Post Flight RAAF
 No. 3 Squadron RAAF
 No. 77 Squadron RAAF
 No. 454 Squadron RAAF
 Aircraft Research and Development Unit RAAF
 Royal Australian Navy
 723 Squadron RAN
 724 Squadron RAN
 725 Squadron RAN

 Burma Air Force - Postwar

 Royal Canadian Air Force
 No. 664 Squadron RCAF
 No. 665 Squadron RCAF
 No. 666 Squadron RCAF
 Canadian Army - Postwar

 Czechoslovakian Air Force - three Auster IIIs, in service from 1945 to 1948.

 Hellenic Air Force - Postwar, 20 Auster IIIs

 Royal Hong Kong Auxiliary Air Force - Postwar

 Indonesian Air Force - Ex-Dutch aircraft

 Israeli Air Force
 (Transjordan)
 Arab Legion
 Royal Jordanian Air Force

 Libyan Air Force

 Royal Netherlands Air Force
 Royal Netherlands Navy
 Dutch Naval Aviation Service
 Royal Netherlands East Indies Army Air Force - Postwar

 Royal Norwegian Air Force in exile in the United Kingdom -  Nine aircraft in service from 1944 to 1945. Used by Nos 331 and 332 Norwegian Squadrons as communications aircraft.

 Pakistan Air Force - Postwar
 Pakistan Army - Ex-Pakistan Air Force aircraft.
 Pakistan Army Aviation Corps

 Polish Air Force in exile in Great Britain
 663 Polski Szwadron Powietrznych Punktów Obserwacyjnych (1944–1946)

 South African Air Force

 British Army
 Army Air Corps
 Royal Air Force

 No. 651 (AOP) Squadron RAF
 No. 652 (AOP) Squadron RAF
 No. 653 (AOP) Squadron RAF
 No. 654 (AOP) Squadron RAF
 No. 655 (AOP) Squadron RAF
 No. 656 (AOP) Squadron RAF
 No. 657 (AOP) Squadron RAF
 No. 658 (AOP) Squadron RAF
 No. 659 (AOP) Squadron RAF
 No. 660 (AOP) Squadron RAF
 No. 661 (AOP) Squadron RAF
 No. 662 (AOP) Squadron RAF
 No. 663 (AOP) Squadron RAF 1947-1949

Specifications (Auster V)

Notable appearances in media

See also

References

Notes

Bibliography
 Blackburn, George. Where The Hell are the Guns?. Toronto, Canada: McClelland & Stewart Publishing, 1997. .
 
 
 Ellison, N. H. Auster Aircraft - Aircraft Production List. Tonbridge, Kent, UK: Air-Britain (Historians) Ltd, 1966.
 Fromow, LCol. D. L. Canada's Flying Gunners: A History of the Air Observation Post of the Royal Regiment of Canadian Artillery. Ottawa, Canada: Air Observation Post Pilots Association, 2002. .
 Hitchman, Ambrose. The History of the Auster Aeroplane. Bingley, UK: International Auster Pilot Club, 1989.
 Jackson, A. J. British Civil Aircraft since 1919, Volume 1. London: Putnam and Company, 1974. .
 Justo, Craig P. "Talkback". Air Enthusiast No. 107, September/October 2003. p. 74. 
 Ketley, Barry. Auster - A Brief History of the Auster Aircraft in British Military Service . Ottringham, UK: Flight Recorder Publications, 2005. .
 Macfarlane, Arrol. "Warlike Sketches, 1939-1945". .
 Nordeen, Lon. Fighters Over Israel. Guild Publishing, 1991. .
 
 
 March, Daniel J. British Warplanes of World War II: Combat Aircraft of the RAF and Fleet Air Arm, 1939-1945. Rochester, Kent, UK: Grange Books plc, 2000. .
 Mead, Brigadier Peter. The Eye in the Air - History of Air Observation and Reconnaissance for the Army 1785-1945. London, UK: Her Majesty's Stationery Office, 1983. .
 Mondey, David. The Hamlyn Concise Guide to British Aircraft of World War II. London: Chancellor Press, 1994. .
 
 "Taylorcraft Auster". The Illustrated Encyclopedia of Aircraft. (Part Work 1982-1985). London: Orbis Publishing, 1985.
 Willis, David. "Military Auster A to Z: Unarmed and in the frontline." Air Enthusiast, Issue 121, January/February 2006, pp. 40–57. .
 Willis, David. "Military Auster A to Z: Post-war use and experimentals." Air Enthusiast, Issue 122, March/April 2006, pp. 42–57. .
 Willis, David. "Military Auster A to Z: n different colours - Exports." Air Enthusiast, Issue 123, May/June 2006, pp. 64–72. .

External links

 Fleet Air Arm archive
 International Auster Pilot Club magazine, 1974

Auster aircraft
1940s British military reconnaissance aircraft
Single-engined tractor aircraft
Aircraft first flown in 1942